Magnolia pleiocarpa is a species of plant in the family Magnoliaceae. It is endemic to the montane forests near Lakhimpur in the state of Assam in India.  It is threatened by habitat loss.

References

Flora of Assam (region)
Critically endangered plants
pleiocarpa